Sayyid Ehsan Ghazizadeh Hashemi is an Iranian Right-wing politician who represents Fariman and Sarakhs in the Parliament of Iran since 2016.
 
He was a senior Ministry of Culture and Islamic Guidance official responsible for oversees domestic media under Mahmoud Ahmadinejad administration.

References

1976 births
Living people
People from Khorasan
Members of the 10th Islamic Consultative Assembly
Front of Islamic Revolution Stability politicians
Secretaries-General of political parties in Iran